Changlinhe railway station is a railway station in  Changlinhe, Feidong County, Hefei, Anhui, China. It is an intermediate stop on the Hefei–Fuzhou high-speed railway. It opened with the line on 28 June 2015. It is the closest high-speed rail station to Chao Lake.

References 

Railway stations in Anhui
Railway stations in China opened in 2015